Vapen & ammunition (Swedish for Weapons & Ammunition) is the fifth studio album by Swedish alternative rock band Kent.  It was released on 15 April 2002 through RCA Records and BMG. Absent from this album is a long, mostly-instrumental song, rounding the album off, as had been a characteristic of the band ever since their second record Verkligen.  The white tiger on the cover is a tribute to the band's hometown Eskilstuna: the zoo in town had white tigers as its main attraction.

Vapen & ammunition was voted Best Album of 2002 on the Grammis awards, the Swedish equivalent to the Grammy. It is the best-selling album by Kent, having sold over 600,000 copies worldwide as of 2007.

Track listing
All music and lyrics written by Joakim Berg, except "FF" lyrics written by Berg and Nancy Danino.

Personnel
Joakim Berg – lyrics, music
Kent – producer
Zmago Smon (Zed) – producer, mixing, recording
Martin von Schmalensee – producer, recording, slide guitar (on track 1), acoustic guitar (on track 9)
Björn Engelmann – mastering
Titiyo – vocals (on track 4)
Nancy Danino – vocals (on track 8)
Henrik Rongedal, Ingela Olson, Jessica Pilnäs, Niklas Gabrielsson – backing vocals (on track 9)
Thobias Gabrielsson – backing vocal arrangement (on track 9)
Jojje Wadenius – acoustic guitar (on track 10)

Charts

Weekly charts

Year-end charts

Certifications

References 

Kent (band) albums
Swedish-language albums
2002 albums